Air Charter Bahamas is an air charter airline based in Miami Springs, Florida, which operates in the Bahamas doing Charter Flights.

Fleet

 Beechcraft Super King Air
 Bombardier Global Express
 Dornier 328JET
 Embraer ERJ-145
 Fokker 70
 Learjet 35

External links
Air Charter Bahamas
Caribbean Aviation
Trans Northern Airways

Companies based in Miami-Dade County, Florida
Airlines based in Florida